99p may refer to:
99p Stores, a now-defunct British chain store
Psychological pricing, a theory that certain prices have a psychological impact

See also
 
 0.99 (disambiguation)
 99% (disambiguation)
 Penny (British decimal coin)
 The 99p Challenge, a spoof radio panel game 
 99P/Kowal, a periodic comet in the Solar System